Yount is an English surname.  Notable people with the surname include:

Barton Kyle Yount (1884–1949), American general
Christian Yount (born 1988), American football long snapper
Ducky Yount (1885–1970), American Major League Baseball pitcher in 1914
Eddie Yount (1915–1973), American Major League Baseball outfielder in 1937 and 1939
George C. Yount (1794–1865), American trapper and explorer, first American resident of California's Napa Valley
Hampton Yount (born 1984), American stand-up comedian
Harry Yount (1837–1924), American mountain man; first de facto park ranger of Yellowstone National Park
Younts Peak, a peak in Wyoming named after Harry Yount
John P. Yount (1850–1872), American soldier and Medal of Honor recipient
Larry Yount (born 1950), American Major League Baseball pitcher in 1971, brother of Robin Yount
Miles Franklin Yount (1880–1933), American oil baron
Robin Yount (born 1955), American Major League Baseball player for the Milwaukee Brewers from 1974 to 1993, Hall of Famer, and brother of Larry Yount

English-language surnames